Ikot Use Ekong is a village in Eket local government area of Akwa Ibom State.

References 

Villages in Akwa Ibom